Nowabad (also Romanized as Nowābād) is a village in Sharq va Gharb-e Shirgah Rural District, North Savadkuh County, Mazandaran Province, Iran. At the 2006 census, its population was 85, in 24 families.

References 

Populated places in Savadkuh County